Malgachinsula tsarafidyella is a species of snout moth in the genus Malgachinsula. It was described by Roesler in 1982, and is known from Madagascar.

References

Moths described in 1982
Phycitinae